Gender differences in suicide rates have been shown to be significant. There are different rates of suicides and suicidal behavior between males and females (among both adults and adolescents). While females more often have suicidal thoughts, males die by suicide more frequently. This discrepancy is also known as the gender paradox in suicide.

Globally, death by suicide occurred about 1.8 times more often among males than among females in 2008, and 1.7 times in 2015. In the Western world, males die by suicide three to four times more often than do females. This greater male frequency is increased in those over the age of 65. Suicide attempts are between two and four times more frequent among females. Researchers have partly attributed the difference between suicide and attempted suicide among the sexes to males using more lethal means to end their lives. Other reasons, including disparities in the strength or genuineness of suicidal thoughts, have also been given.

Overview 

The role that gender plays as a risk factor for suicide has been studied extensively. While females, particularly those under the age of 25, show higher rates of non-fatal suicidal behavior and suicide thoughts, and attempt suicide more frequently than males do, males have a much higher rate of suicide. This is known as the gender paradox in suicide, a term coined by Silvia Sara Canetto and Isaac Sakinofsky.

According to the World Health Organization (WHO), challenges represented by social stigma, the taboo to openly discuss suicide, and low availability of data are obstacles leading to poor data quality for both suicide and suicide attempts. The organization states that "given the sensitivity of suicide – and the illegality of suicidal behaviour in some countries – it is likely that under-reporting and misclassification are greater problems for suicide than for most other causes of death."

Factors 
Many researchers have attempted to find explanations for why gender is such a significant indicator for suicide.
A common explanation relies on the social constructions of hegemonic masculinity and femininity. According to literature on gender and suicide, male suicide rates are explained in terms of traditional gender roles. Male gender roles tend to emphasize greater levels of strength, independence, risk-taking behavior, economic status, and individualism. Reinforcement of this gender role often prevents males from seeking help for suicidal feelings and depression.

Various other factors have been put forward as the cause of the gender paradox. Part of the gap may be explained by heightened levels of stress that result from traditional gender roles. For example, the death of a spouse and divorce are risk factors for suicide in both genders, but the effect is somewhat mitigated for females. In the Western world, females are more likely to maintain social and familial connections that they can turn to for support after losing their spouse. Another factor closely tied to gender roles is male employment status. Males' vulnerability may be heightened during times of unemployment because of societal expectations that they should provide for themselves and their families.

The gender gap is less stark in developing nations. One theory put forward for the smaller gap is the increased burden of motherhood due to cultural norms. In regions where the identity of females is constructed around the family, having young children may correlate with lower risks for suicide. At the same time, stigma attached to infertility or having children outside of marriage can contribute to higher rates of suicide among women.

In 2003, a group of sociologists examined the gender and suicide gap by considering how cultural factors impacted suicide rates. The four cultural factors – power-distance, individualism, uncertainty avoidance, and masculinity – were measured for 66 countries using data from the World Health Organization. Cultural beliefs regarding individualism were most closely tied to the gender gap; countries that placed a higher value on individualism showed higher rates of male suicide. Power-distance, defined as the social separation of people based on finances or status, was negatively correlated with suicide. However, countries with high levels of power-distance had higher rates of female suicide. The study ultimately found that stabilizing cultural factors had a stronger effect on suicide rates for women than men.

Differing methods by gender 

The reported difference in suicide rates for males and females is partially a result of the methods used by each gender. Although females attempt suicide at a higher rate, they are more likely to use methods that are less immediately lethal. Males frequently die by suicide via high mortality actions such as hanging, carbon-monoxide poisoning, and firearms. This is in contrast to females, who tend to rely on drug overdosing. While overdosing can be deadly, it is less immediate and therefore more likely to be caught before death occurs. In Europe, where the gender discrepancy is the greatest, a study found that the most frequent method of suicide among both genders was hanging; however, the use of hanging was significantly higher in males (54.3%) than in females (35.6%). The same study found that the second most common methods were firearms (9.7%) for men and poisoning by drugs (24.7%) for women.

Some research says that males using deadlier means to die by suicide cannot be the only reason for the gender disparity. One reason for this may be that men who try to commit suicide may have a stronger and more genuine will to end their own lives, while women engage in more "suicidal gestures". Other research suggests that even when men and women use the same methods, men are still more likely to die from them.

Preventive strategies 
In the United States, both the Department of Health and Human Services and the American Foundation for Suicide Prevention address different methods of reducing suicide, but do not recognize the separate needs of males and females. In 2002, the English Department of Health launched a suicide prevention campaign that was aimed at high-risk groups including young men, prisoners, and those with mental health disorders. The Campaign Against Living Miserably is a charity in the UK that attempts to highlight this issue for public discussion. Some studies have found that because young females are at a higher risk of attempting suicide, policies tailored towards this demographic are most effective at reducing overall rates. Researchers have also recommended more aggressive and long-term treatments and follow up for males that show indications of suicidal thoughts. Shifting cultural attitudes about gender roles and norms, and especially ideas about masculinity, may also contribute to closing the gender gap.

Statistics 

The incidence of suicide is vastly higher among males than females among all age groups in most of the world. , almost two-thirds of worldwide suicides (representing about 1.5% of all deaths) are by men.

United States 

Since the 1950s, typically males die from suicide three to five times more often than females. Use of mental health resources may be a significant contributor to the gender difference in suicide rates in the US. Studies have shown that females are 13–21% more likely than males to receive a psychiatric affective diagnosis. 72–89% of females who died by suicide had contact with a mental health professional at some point in their life and 41–58% of males who died by suicide had contact with a mental health professional.

Within the United States, there are variances in gendered rates of suicide by ethnic group. According to the CDC, as of 2013 the suicide rates of Whites and American Indians are more than twice the rates of African Americans and Hispanics. Explanations for why rates of suicide and attempted suicide vary by ethnicity are often based on cultural differences. Among African American suicides, it has been suggested that females usually have better access to communal and familial relations that may mitigate other risk factors for suicide. Among Hispanic populations, the same study showed that cultural values of marianismo, which emphasizes female docility and deference to males, may help explain the higher rate of suicide of Latinas relative to Latinos. The authors of this study did not extrapolate their conclusions on ethnicity to populations outside the United States.

Europe 
The gender-suicide gap is generally highest in Western countries. Among the nations of Europe, the gender gap is particularly large in Eastern European countries such as Lithuania, Belarus, and Hungary. Some researchers attribute the higher rates in former Soviet countries to be a remnant of recent political instability. An increased focus on family led to females becoming more highly valued. Rapid economic fluctuations prevented males from providing fully for their families, which prevented them from fulfilling their traditional gender role. Combined, these factors could account for the gender gap. Other research indicates that higher instances of alcoholism among males in these nations may be to blame. In 2014, suicides rates amongst under-45 men in UK reached a 15-year high of 78% of the total 5,140.

Non-Western nations 
A higher male mortality from suicide is also evident from data of non-Western countries: the Caribbean, often considered part of the West is the most prominent example. In 1979–81, out of 74 countries with a non-zero suicide rate, 69 countries had male suicide rates greater than females, two reported equal rates for the sexes (Seychelles and Kenya), while three reported female rates exceeding male rates (Papua New Guinea, Macau, and French Guiana). The contrast is even greater today, with WHO statistics showing China as the only country where the suicide rate of females matches or exceeds that of males. Barraclough found that the female rates of those aged 5–14 equaled or exceeded the male rates only in 14 countries, mainly in South America and Asia.

China 
In most countries, the majority of suicides are by men but in China, women are slightly more likely to die by suicide than men. In 2015 China's ratio was around 8 males for every 10 females. According to the WTO, the suicide rates in China for men and women were almost the same – 9.1 for male versus 10.3 for female (the rate is per 100,000 people).

Traditional gender roles in China hold women responsible for keeping the family happy and intact. Suicide for women in China is shown in literature to be an acceptable way to avoid disgrace that may be brought to themselves or their families.  According to a 2002 review, the most common reasons for the difference in rate between genders are: "the lower status of Chinese women, love, marriage, marital infidelity, and family problems, the methods used to commit suicide, and mental health of Chinese women."  Another explanation for increased suicide in women in China is that pesticides are easily accessible and tend to be used in many suicide attempts made by women.  The rate of nonlethal suicidal behavior is 40 to 60 percent higher in women than it is in men. This is due to the fact that more women are diagnosed as depressed than men, and also that depression is correlated with suicide attempts. However, thanks to urbanization, suicide rates in China – for both women and men – have dropped by 64% from 1990 to 2016.

See also 
Mental disorders and gender
List of suicides (antiquity-present)
List of suicides in the 21st century

References 

Gender and society
Men's health
Suicides
Suicide rates
Suicide